Catacamas virus is a single-stranded, enveloped novel RNA virus in the genus Orthohantavirus of the order Bunyavirales isolated in Oryzomys couesi near the town of Catacamas in eastern Honduras.  It is a member virus of Bayou orthohantavirus.

Natural reservoir 
Catacamas virus was isolated from Oryzomys couesi and none of 41 other rodents that were also trapped near the town of Catacamas. The finding represents the first time a hantavirus species has been found in Honduras.

Virology 
Analysis of nucleotide and amino acid sequence data indicated that this hantaviral strain is phylogenetically most closely related to Bayou orthohantavirus which is associated with the marsh rice rat (Oryzomys palustris) in the southeastern United States.

See also 
 Playa de Oro virus

References

External links 
 CDC's Hantavirus Technical Information Index page
 Virus Pathogen Database and Analysis Resource (ViPR): Hantaviridae

Viral diseases
Hantaviridae
Hemorrhagic fevers
Infraspecific virus taxa